Lukáš Trefil (born 21 September 1988 in Prague) is a Czech canoeist. He won a bronze medal at the 2012 Summer Olympics and the 2016 Olympics in the K-4 1000 m event.

He has also been a World Champion and multiple time European champion in this event.

He first began canoeing in 1998 and began competing in 2005.

References

External links
 
 

1988 births
Living people
Czech male canoeists
Olympic canoeists of the Czech Republic
Canoeists at the 2012 Summer Olympics
Canoeists at the 2016 Summer Olympics
Olympic bronze medalists for the Czech Republic
Olympic medalists in canoeing
Medalists at the 2012 Summer Olympics
Medalists at the 2016 Summer Olympics
European Games competitors for the Czech Republic
Canoeists at the 2015 European Games
Canoeists from Prague